The Casablanca Stock Exchange is a stock exchange in Casablanca, Morocco. The Casablanca Stock Exchange (CSE), which achieves one of the best performances in the region of the Middle East and North Africa (MENA), is Africa's third largest stock market after Johannesburg Stock Exchange (South Africa) and Nigerian Stock Exchange in Lagos. It was established in 1929 and currently has 19 members and 81 listed securities with a total market capitalisation of $71.1 billion in 2018.

The exchange is relatively modern, having experienced reform in 1993. The CSE installed an Electronic trading platform, and is now organized as two markets: the Central Market and a Block Trade Market, for block trades.

In 1997 the CSE opened a central scrip depository, Maroclear.

Indexes
Originally, CSE had the Index de la Bourse des Valeurs de Casablanca (IGB) as an index. IGB was replaced in January 2002 by two indexes:

MASI
MASI (Moroccan All Shares Index), comprises all listed shares, allows investors to follow all listed values and to have a long-term visibility.

MADEX
MADEX (Moroccan Most Active Shares Index), comprises most active shares listed continuously with variations closely linked to all the market serves as a reference for the listing of all funds invested in shares.
This index was replaced by MSI20 from the starting of 2022.

CFG 25 
CFG 25 consists of 25 stocks listed on the Casablanca Stock Exchange and about 80% of the total market capitalization of all the companies listed on the Casablanca Stock Exchange.

Performance reports
The stock markets of Casablanca and Tunis (Bourse de Tunis) are covered in a quarterly report on Arab stock exchanges established by the Abu Dhabi-based Arab Monetary Fund. The report includes individual indices for each market, as well as a weighted composite tracking four Middle Eastern and two North African stock exchanges.

Related organizations
Central Bank of Morocco (BAM)
Brokage Firms Association (APSB)
The Deontologic Council for Securities (CDVM)
Moroccan Trust Companies and Investment Funds Association (ASFIM)
Moroccan Companies General Confederation (CGEM)
Moroccan Banks Professional Grouping (GPBM)
Ministry of Economy and Finance

See also
Economy of Morocco
List of African stock exchanges
List of Mideast stock exchanges
 List of stock exchanges

References

External links
 List of Companies in the Casablanca Stock Exchange
 Casablanca Stock Exchange website

 
1929 establishments in Morocco
Financial services companies established in 1929
Stock exchanges in Morocco
Economy of Morocco
Financial services companies of Morocco
20th-century architecture in Morocco